Paleki-ye Abdi (also Romanized as Pālekī-ye ‘Abdī; also known as Pālekī-ye Bālā and Pālekī-ye ‘Olyā) is a village in Poshteh-ye Zilayi Rural District, Sarfaryab District, Charam County, Kohgiluyeh and Boyer-Ahmad Province, Iran. At the 2006 census, its population was 83, in 16 families.

References 

Populated places in Charam County